Fishermen's Wharf Market, also known as Wharf Shed 1, is a large enclosed building that used to host Sunday markets in Port Adelaide. It is located in the Inner Harbor of Port Adelaide adjacent to the Birkenhead Bridge.

History 

In the 1930s McLaren Wharf was redeveloped to accommodate the increase in volume of shipping coming through Port Adelaide.

Market Closure 
It was open on Sundays from 9am to 4pm. Monday Public Holidays from 9am to 4pm.

The Markets where closed in August/September 2022.

References

External links

Economy of Adelaide
Tourist attractions in Adelaide
Retail markets in Australia
Retail buildings in South Australia